Wormley is a village in Surrey, England in the parish of Witley, around Witley station, off the A283 Petworth Road about  SSW of Godalming.

History

Expansion from archetypal hamlet
Wormley developed primarily as a result of the construction in the 19th century of Witley station, on the Portsmouth Direct line. King Edward's School, Witley once had its own station platform.

Former businesses
Cooper & Sons Ltd owned the Combelane walking stick factory; this was replaced by houses with small gardens and a light industrial estate. The Institute of Oceanographic Sciences Deacon Laboratory was here from 1952 to 1995, housed in the former Admiralty Signals Establishment building on Brook Road. The only public house, the Wood Pigeon, closed in 2007.

Architecture and gardens
King Edward's School is a Grade II listed building, the school war memorial is also Grade II listed. Some of the gardens in Wormley were designed by Gertrude Jekyll, who collaborated with Edward Lutyens from her home in Busbridge, a nearby village.

Notable former residents
George Eliot is a former resident.
Louis de Bernières who based his collection of short stories, Notwithstanding, on the local area.  De Bernières muses whether Wormley is, or is no longer, the rural idyll.
Gertrude Mary Tuckwell lived the last twenty years of her life in Little Woodlands, Combe Lane.

References

External links
Photos of Wormley

Villages in Surrey
Borough of Waverley